The 1939 St. Edward's Crusaders football team was an American football team that represented St. Edward's University as a member of the Texas Conference during 1933 college football season. St. Edward's changed its fight name from the Tigers to the Crusaders prior to the season.

Schedule

References

St. Edward's
St. Edward's Crusaders football seasons
St. Edward's Crusaders football